The 1999 Northwest Missouri State Bearcats football team was an American football team that won the 1999 NCAA Division II Football Championship. 

The team represented Northwest Missouri State University in the Mid-America Intercollegiate Athletics Association (MIAA) during the 1999 NCAA Division II football season. In their sixth season under head coach Mel Tjeerdsma, the Bearcats compiled a 14–1 record (9–0 against conference opponents) and won the MIAA championship.

The team advanced to the NCAA Division II playoffs and won the national championship by defeating , 58–52, in the championship game.

The team played its home games at Bearcat Stadium in Maryville, Missouri.

Schedule

References

Northwest Missouri
Northwest Missouri State Bearcats football seasons
NCAA Division II Football Champions
Mid-America Intercollegiate Athletics Association football champion seasons
Northwest Missouri State Bearcats football